The International Phonetic Alphabet (IPA) requires specific names for the symbols and diacritics used in the alphabet.

It is often desirable to distinguish an IPA symbol from the sound it is intended to represent, since there is not a one-to-one correspondence between symbol and sound in broad transcription. The symbol's names and phonetic descriptions are described in the Handbook of the International Phonetic Association. The symbols also have nonce names in the Unicode standard. In some cases, the Unicode names and the IPA names do not agree. For example, IPA calls  "epsilon", but Unicode calls it "small letter open E".

Letters
The traditional names of the Latin and Greek letters are used for unmodified symbols. In Unicode, some of the symbols of Greek origin have Latin forms for use in IPA; the others use the symbols from the Greek section.

Examples:

Note

Cursive-based letters
A few letters have the forms of cursive or script letters. Examples:

Note

Ligatures
Ligatures are called precisely that, although Unicode often mistakenly calls them "digraphs" and some have dedicated names, such as ash and ethel. Examples:

Rotated letters

Many letters are turned, or rotated 180 degrees. Examples:

Notes

A few letters are reversed (flipped on a vertical axis):

Notes

One letter is inverted (flipped on a horizontal axis):  inverted capital small R. ( could also be called an inverted w, but turned w is more common.)

Letters with extra lines, curls and serifs
When a horizontal stroke is added, it is called a crossbar:  barred h,  barred o,  reversed barred glottal stop or barred ayin,  barred dotless j or barred gelded j (apparently never 'turned f'),  double-barred pipe, etc.

One letter instead has a slash through it:  slashed o.

The implosives have hook tops:  hook-top b, as does  hook-top h.

Such an extension at the bottom of a letter is called a tail. It may be specified as left or right depending on which direction it turns:  right-tail n,  right-tail turned r,  left-tail n,  tail z (or just retroflex z), etc. But note:  eng or engma,  meng,  heng.

When the tail loops over itself, it's called curly:  curly-tail j,  curly-tail c.

There are also a few unique modifications:  belted l,  closed reversed epsilon (there was once also a  closed omega),  right-leg turned m,  turned long-leg r (there was once also a long-leg r),  double pipe, and the obsolete  stretched c.

Several non-English letters have traditional names:  c cedilla,  eth (also spelled edh),  engma or eng,  schwa (also spelled shwa),  exclamation mark,  pipe.

Other symbols are unique to the IPA, and have developed their own quirky names:  fish-hook r,  ram's horns,  bull's eye,  esh (apparently never 'stretched s'),  ezh (sometimes confused with yogh),  hook-top heng.

The  is usually called by the sound it represents, glottal stop. This is not normally a problem, because this symbol is seldom used to represent anything else. However, to specify the symbol itself, it is sometimes called a gelded question mark. This latter name is derived from its original form as a dotless question mark in a fashion reminiscent of gelding.

Diacritic marks

Traditionally named diacritics
 acute,  macron,  grave,  circumflex,  wedge or háček,  diaeresis or umlaut,  breve,  (superscript) tilde, plus variants such as  subscript tilde,  superimposed tilde, etc.

Non-traditionally named diacritics
 seagull,  hook,  over-cross,  corner,  bridge,  inverted bridge,  square,  under-ring,  over-ring,  left half-ring,  right half-ring,  plus,  under-bar,  arch,  subscript wedge,  up tack,  down tack,  left tack,  right tack,  tie bar,  under-dot,  under-stroke.

Diacritics are alternately named after their function: The bridge is also called the dental sign, the under-stroke the syllabicity sign, etc.

References
 Pullum, Geoffrey K., and William A. Ladusaw. 1996. Phonetic Symbol Guide, 2nd edn. Chicago: University of Chicago Press.

External links
 Unicode-HTML codes for IPA symbols: Tables of symbol names and HTML codes at PennState.

International Phonetic Alphabet
Unicode
International Phonetic Alphabet